Discomyzinae is a subfamily of shore flies in the family Ephydridae.

Genera
Tribe Discomyzini Acloque, 1897
Actocetor Becker, 1903
Discomyza Meigen, 1830
Clasiopella Hendel, 1914
Tribe Psilopini Cresson, 1942
Achaetorisa Papp, 1980
Ceropsilopa Cresson, 1917
Clanoneurum Becker, 1903
Cnestrum Becker, 1896
Helaeomyia Cresson, 1941
Leptopsilopa Cresson, 1922
Psilopa Fallén, 1823
Risa Becker, 1907
Rhynchopsilopa Hendel, 1913
Scoliocephalus Becker, 1903
Trimerina Macquart, 1835

References

Ephydridae
Brachycera subfamilies
Taxa named by Alexandre Noël Charles Acloque